G.I. are initials used to describe the soldiers of the United States Army and airmen of the United States Air Force and general items of their equipment. The term G.I. has been used as an initialism of "Government Issue", "General Issue", or "Ground Infantry", and was used by the logistics services of the United States Armed Forces.

During World War I, American soldiers sardonically referred to incoming German artillery shells as "G.I. cans". Also during that war, "G.I." started being interpreted as "Government Issue" or "General Issue" for the general items of equipment of soldiers and airmen. The term "G.I." came into widespread use in the United States with the start of the Selective Service System ("the draft") in 1940, extending into 1941. It gradually replaced the term "Doughboy" that was used in World War I and the use of "G.I." expanded from 1942 through 1945. American five-star General Dwight D. Eisenhower said in 1945 that "the truly heroic figure of this war [is] G.I. Joe and his counterpart in the air, the navy, and the Merchant Marine of every one of the United Nations".

"G.I." was also used as an adjective for anything having to do with the U.S. Army or Army Air Forces.

They Call Me Joe was a series of radio dramas aired in 1944. Each episode focused on a different fictional American soldier.  A soldier of a different national or ethnic origin was selected for each episode, but he was always identified as a G.I. named Joe. The series was intended to encourage Americans of varying backgrounds to cooperate to win World War II. It was produced by the NBC University of the Air, which also produced a series The World's Great Novels. The series ran for twelve weeks and aired both on the NBC Radio Network and the Armed Forces Radio Network.

"G.I. Joe", an action figure, was introduced by Hasbro in 1964. Its name comes from the term used to describe soldiers during the war.

In British military parlance and in armed forces modelled on British military traditions, G.I. refers to a Gunnery Instructor (generally an NCO responsible for inducting and training recruits).

See also
 Digger (soldier) – A similar term used in Australia
 Dogface (military)
 Folk etymology
 G.I. Bill
 G.I. Blues (film)
 G.I. Generation 
 G.I. Jane (film)
 G.I. Jill – disk jockey for the WW II program G.I Jive
 G.I. Joe (pigeon) – a pigeon who served in World War II
 G.I. Joe (disambiguation)
 G-Man (slang)
 The Story of G.I. Joe (1945 film)
 Tommy Atkins (soldier) – British slang for a common soldier
 Mehmetçik (soldier) – Turkish slang for a common soldier

References

External links 
 

Initialisms
Military terminology of the United States